Sook Ching was a mass killing that occurred from 18 February to 4 March 1942 in Singapore after it fell to the Japanese. It was a systematic purge and massacre of 'anti-Japanese' elements in Singapore, with the Singaporean Chinese particularly targeted by the Japanese military during the occupation. However, Japanese soldiers engaged in indiscriminate killing, and did not try to identify who was 'anti-Japanese.' Singapore was a crucial strategic point in World War II. From 8 February to 15 February, the Japanese had fought for control of the city. The combined British and Commonwealth forces surrendered in a stunning defeat to the outnumbered Japanese on 15 February which led to its fall. The loss of Singapore was and still is Britain's largest surrender in history.

Three days later after the fall on 18 February, the occupying Japanese military began mass killings of a wide range of "undesirables", who were mostly ethnic Chinese, influenced by the events of the Second Sino-Japanese War that was raging simultaneously as far back as 1937. The operation was overseen by the Imperial Japanese Army's Kempeitai, its secret police. Along with Singapore, Sook Ching was subsequently also extended to include the Chinese population in Malaya, which was also under occupation by the Japanese. Concurrently, non-Chinese individuals were also not completely spared in other parts of Asia under Japanese occupation; the Japanese had also killed at least 150,000 Tamil Indians as well as an additional 90,000 civilians in Burma and Thailand, many of which were also forced to work on the Siam–Burma Railway, infamously known as the Death Railway.

The aim for such a purge was to intimidate the Chinese community, which was considered by the Japanese to be potentially the main centre of resistance to Japanese aims of territorial expansion throughout the Asia-Pacific. The Japanese had also thought of it as a "revenge" for their perceived anti-Japanese activity in the Sinophone regions, such as procuring financial aid for China after the Japanese invasion of Manchuria and during the Second Sino-Japanese War. As a consequence, Sook Ching was aimed primarily at Chinese political and social activists, volunteers fighting on the side of the Allies, as well as representatives of Chinese triads. In practice, however, the arrests and executions were carried out by the Japanese in a completely arbitrary manner, with many civilians randomly killed in summary executions even if they took no part in any organised resistance. 

After the war, the Japanese authorities acknowledged that the massacre took place, but disagreed about the number of deaths that Japan had caused. Japan alleged that no more "than 6,000 deaths" had occurred, while Singapore's first prime minister Lee Kuan Yew, who was himself almost a victim to Sook Ching, stated that verifiable numbers would put it at "about 70,000", including the figures in Malaya. When mass graves were discovered in 1962, Singaporeans heavily lobbied for their government to demand compensation as well as an official apology from the Japanese government. 

On 25 October 1966, the Japanese government ultimately agreed to reimburse S$50 million in reparations, half of which constituting as a grant and the rest as a loan. However, the wording used for this reimbursement were classified as a "gesture of atonement", with words such as "damages" or "reparations" being avoided by the Japanese. Furthermore, the Japanese government continued to refuse accepting legal responsibility for the massacre, which would include carrying out an official investigation or inquiry of the deaths. No official apology was also made.

Remains of Sook Ching victims would subsequently continue to be unearthed by Singaporeans for decades after the massacre. In 1963, the Civilian War Memorial was constructed in memory of the civilians killed during the occupation, including Sook Ching. Remains belonging to some of the victims were also placed in a tomb under the memorial. In 1992, the various Sook Ching massacre sites around the country such as Changi Beach, Katong, Punggol Point, Tanah Merah and Sentosa were designated with historic plaque markers as heritage sites by the Singaporean government's National Heritage Board, to commemorate the 50th anniversary of the occupation.

Etymology

Japan
The Japanese referred to the Sook Ching as the Kakyō Shukusei ('purging of Overseas Chinese') or as the Shingapōru Daikenshō ('great inspection of Singapore'). The current Japanese term for the massacre is Shingapōru Kakyō Gyakusatsu Jiken ('Singapore Overseas Chinese Massacre').

Singapore
Singapore's National Heritage Board (NHB) uses the term Sook Ching in its publications.

Planning of the massacre
According to postwar testimony taken from a war correspondent embedded with the 25th army, Colonel Hishakari Takafumi, an order to kill 50,000 Chinese, 20 percent of the total, was issued by senior officials on Yamashita's operations staff, either from Lieutenant Colonel Tsuji Masanobu, Chief of Planning and Operations, or Major Hayashi Tadahiko, Chief of Staff.

Hirofumi Hayashi, a professor of politics at a university and the co-director of the Center for Research and Documentation on Japan's War Responsibility, writes that the massacre was premeditated, and that "the Chinese in Singapore were regarded as anti-Japanese even before the Japanese military landed". It is also clear from the passage below that the massacre was to be extended to the Chinese in Malaya as well.

After the Japanese military occupied Singapore, they were aware that the local Chinese population was loyal to the Republic of China. Some Chinese had been financing the National Revolutionary Army in the Second Sino-Japanese War through a series of fund-raising propagandist events.

Targeted groups
The Japanese military authorities defined the following as "undesirables":

 Activists in the China Relief
 Wealthy philanthropists who had contributed generously to the China Relief Fund, such as modernist architect Ho Kwong Yew, who designed and built many notable houses in Singapore for the wealthy Chinese community
 Adherents of Tan Kah Kee, leader of the Nanyang National Salvation Movement
 Hainan people, who were perceived to be communists
 China-born Chinese who came to Malaya after the Second Sino-Japanese War
 Men with tattoos, who were perceived to be triad members
 Chinese who joined the Singapore Overseas Chinese Anti-Japanese Volunteer Army
 Civil servants and people likely to sympathise with the British, such as Justices of the Peace and members of the legislative council
 Anyone who possessed weapons and were likely to "disrupt public security"

Purge

Screening

After the fall of Singapore, Masayuki Oishi, commander of No. 2 Field Kenpeitai, set up his headquarters in the YMCA Building at Stamford Road as the Kenpeitai East District Branch. The Kenpeitai prison was in Outram with branches in Stamford Road, Chinatown and the Central Police Station. A residence at the intersection of Smith Street and New Bridge Road formed the Kenpeitai West District Branch.

Under Oishi's command were 200 regular Kenpeitai officers and another 1000 auxiliaries, who were mostly young and rough peasant soldiers. Singapore was divided into sectors with each sector under the control of an officer. The Japanese set up designated "screening centres" all over Singapore to gather and "screen" Chinese males between the ages of 18 and 50. Those who were thought to be "anti-Japanese" would be eliminated. Sometimes, women and children were also sent for inspection as well.

According to Kevin Blackburn, associate professor at Nanyang Technological University:

The following passage is from an article from the National Heritage Board:

According to the A Country Study: Singapore published by the Federal Research Division of the Library of Congress:

After the Japanese military occupied Singapore, they were aware that the local Chinese population was loyal to the Republic of China. Some Chinese had been financing the National Revolutionary Army in the Second Sino-Japanese War through a series of fund-raising propagandist events.

The ones who passed the "screening" received a piece of paper bearing the word "examined" or have a square ink mark stamped on their arms or shirts. Those who failed were stamped with triangular marks instead. They were separated from the others and packed into trucks near the centres and sent to the killing sites.

Execution
There were several sites for the killings, the most notable ones being Changi Beach, Punggol Point and Sentosa (or Pulau Belakang Mati).

In a quarterly newsletter, the National Heritage Board published the account of the life story of a survivor named Chia Chew Soo, whose father, uncles, aunts, brothers and sisters were bayoneted one by one by Japanese soldiers in Simpang Village.

Extension to Chinese community of Malaya
At the behest of Masanobu Tsuji, the Japanese High Command's Chief of Planning and Operations, Sook Ching was extended to the rest of Malaya. However, due to a far wider population distribution across urban centres and vast rural regions, the Chinese population in Malaya was less concentrated and more difficult to survey. Lacking sufficient time and manpower to organise a full "screening", the Japanese opted instead to conduct widespread and indiscriminate massacres of the Chinese population. The primary bulk of the killings were conducted between February to March, and were largely concentrated in the southern states of Malaya, closer to Singapore.

Targeted locations
Specific incidents were Kota Tinggi, Johore (28 February 1942) – 2,000 killed; Gelang Patah, Johor (4 March) – 300 killed; Benut, Johor (6 March) – number unknown; Johore Bahru, Senai, Kulai, Sedenak, Pulai, Renggam, Kluang, Yong Peng, Batu Pahat, Senggarang, Parit Bakau, and Muar (February–March) – estimated up to 25,000 Chinese were killed in Johor; Tanjung Kling, Malacca (16 March) – 142 killed; Kuala Pilah, Negeri Sembilan (15 March) – 76 killed; Parit Tinggi, Negeri Sembilan (16 March) – more than 100 killed (the entire village); Joo Loong Loong (near the present village of Titi) on 18 March (1474 killed, entire village eliminated by Major Yokokoji Kyomi and his troops); and Penang (April) – several thousand killed by Major Higashigawa Yoshimura. Further massacres were instigated as a result of increased guerilla activity in Malaya, most notably at Sungei Lui, a village of 400 in Jempol District, Negeri Sembilan, which was wiped out on 31 July 1942 by troops under a Corporal Hashimoto.

Mass murder of Tamils of Malaya and Singapore
The Japanese also killed about 150,000 Tamil Indians in Thailand and Myanmar during the war, although it is believed that the true number of deaths is much higher for the Tamil Indians. It excludes the death toll of the Malayali Indians. The Indians came from Singapore or Malaya under Japanese supervision.

Japanese camp guards frequently killed entire Indian families or the entire Indian population of whole camps. They also killed Indian families or camps that were infected with typhus, sometimes for sadistic reasons. Aside from killing the Indians, Japanese soldiers often gang raped Tamil women after which they would force other Indian coolies to rape the Indian women.

Death toll
Due to the lack of concrete written records by the Japanese when orchestrating the massacre as well as many of the deaths being the result of random summary executions, the official death toll remains unknown. Japan acknowledged the massacre after the war, but alleged a death toll of about 6,000, whereas the Singaporean Chinese community as well as prime minister Lee Kuan Yew alleged a death toll of about 70,000 to 100,000. Retrospective analysis by historians as well as the scale of mass graves that was discovered decades after the massacre ranges the death toll at about 25,000 to 50,000.

According to Lieutenant Colonel Hishakari Takafumi, a newspaper correspondent at the time, the plan was to ultimately kill about 50,000 Chinese, and half that (25,000) had already been achieved when the order was received to scale down the operation. He said Major Hayashi Tadahiko told him that "it had been found to be impossible to kill the whole of the 50,000 people, as after half that number had been killed an order was received 'to stop the massacre.'"

Japanese historian Hirofumi Hayashi wrote in another paper that the death toll "needs further investigation":

Having witnessed the brutality of the Japanese, Lee made the following comments:

Prominent victims
Chinese film pioneer Hou Yao had emigrated to Singapore in 1940 to work for the Shaw brothers as well as to largely avoid the Japanese invasion of China. Because Hou had directed and written a number of patriotic Chinese "national defence" films against that invasion, he was targeted by the Japanese immediately after Singapore fell and killed at the beginning of the massacre.

Aftermath

Trial
In 1947, after the Japanese surrender, British authorities in Singapore held a war crimes trial for the perpetrators of the Sook Ching. Seven Japanese officers: Takuma Nishimura, Saburo Kawamura, Masayuki Oishi, Yoshitaka Yokata, Tomotatsu Jo, Satoru Onishi, and Haruji Hisamatsu, were charged with conducting the massacre. Staff officer Masanobu Tsuji was the mastermind behind the massacre, and personally planned and carried it out, but at the time of the war crimes trials he had not been arrested. As soon as the war ended, Tsuji escaped from Thailand to China. The accused seven persons who followed Tsuji's commands were on trial.

During the trial, one major problem was that the Japanese commanders did not pass down any formal written orders for the massacre. Documentation of the screening process or disposal procedures had also been destroyed. Besides, the Japanese military headquarters' order for the speedy execution of the operation, combined with ambiguous instructions from the commanders, led to suspicions being cast on the accused, and it became difficult to accurately establish their culpability.

Verdict
Saburo Kawamura and Masayuki Oishi received the death penalty while the other five received life sentences, though Takuma Nishimura was later executed in 1951 following conviction by an Australian military court for his role in the Parit Sulong Massacre. The court accepted the defence statement of "just following orders" by those put on trial. The condemned were hanged on 26 June 1947. The British authorities allowed only six members of the victims' families to witness the executions of Kawamura and Oishi, despite calls for the hangings to be made public.

The mastermind behind the massacre, Masanobu Tsuji, escaped. Tsuji, later after the trial and the execution, appeared in Japan and became a politician there. Tsuji evaded trial, but later disappeared, presumedly killed in Laos in 1961. Tomoyuki Yamashita, the general from whose headquarters the order seems to have been issued, was put on another trial in the Philippines and executed in 1946. Other staff officers, who planned the massacre, were Shigeharu Asaeda and Sōsaku Suzuki. But, as Shigeharu was captured in Russia after the war, and Suzuki killed in action in 1945 before the end of the war, they were not put on trial.

The reminiscences of Saburo Kawamura were published in 1952 (after his death) and, in the book, he expressed his condolences to the victims of Singapore and prayed for the repose of their souls.

Mamoru Shinozaki (February 1908 – 1991), a former Japanese diplomat, has been described as instrumental as key prosecution witness during the Singapore War Crimes Trial between 1946 and 1948. Shinozaki remains a controversial figure, with some blaming him for saying positive things about the accused (despite being a prosecuting witness); views on him continue to vary, with opinions ranging from calling him the "wire-puller" of the massacre or criticizing him for "self-praise" in his autobiography to calling him a life-saving "Schindler" of Singapore.

Post-war sentiment

Reparations
When Singapore gained full self-government from the British colonial government in 1959, waves of anti-Japanese sentiments arose within the Chinese community and they demanded reparations and an apology from Japan. Prior to self-governance, the British colonial government had only demanded war reparations for damage caused to British property during the war, but not the ones suffered by the Chinese, Malays, and Indians. Actions such as these, among others, was what resulted in many of the local populace of all ethnic groups feeling that the British were no longer competent in Singapore's administration and defence after the war.

The Japanese Foreign Ministry declined Singapore's request for an apology and reparations in 1963, stating that the issue of war reparations with the British had already been settled in the San Francisco Treaty in 1951 and hence with Singapore as well, which was then still a British colony. Singapore's first prime minister Lee Kuan Yew responded by saying that the British colonial government did not represent the voice of Singaporeans. In September 1963, the Chinese community staged a boycott of Japanese imports by refusing to unload aircraft and ships from Japan, which lasted for a week.

Lee, however, was also a pragmatist, and was actually somewhat concerned by the boycott. He felt that the tenacious emphasis on the martyrdom of the Sook Ching victims would disrupt the fragile ethnic balance and destroy his efforts to build a united Singaporean national identity, in addition to obstructing Singapore's laissez-faire economic policy at the Port of Singapore. As a result, he took the position that the commemoration activities must be aimed at paying tribute to all civilian victims of the Japanese occupation, irrespective of their ethnic origin. After all, he added that the Japanese were brutal to all ethnic groups. Lee also wanted Japan's compensation to the families of Sook Ching victims to also complement contributing to the development of Singapore.

Acknowledgement
According to Hirofumi Hayashi, the Japanese Ministry of Foreign Affairs "accepted that the Japanese military had carried out mass killings in Singapore ... During negotiations with Singapore, the Japanese government rejected demands for reparations but agreed to make a 'gesture of atonement' by providing funds in other ways."

Nevertheless, the Japanese government was motivated to provide compensation to Singapore because of the potential economic damage to Japan as a result of a boycott or sabotage by the local Chinese should Singapore's demands be rejected. They also saw the potential for Singapore's post-war ensuing success and was keen on repairing their relations.

With Singapore's full independence from Malaysia on 9 August 1965, the Singapore government made another request to Japan for reparations and an apology. On 25 October 1966, Japan agreed to pay S$50 million in compensation, half of which was a grant and the rest as a loan. However, Japan did not make an official apology. These payments were also classified as a "gesture of atonement", and not "damages" or "reparations".

Remains and commemoration

Due to the fact that only a few remains of Sook Ching victims were found during the occupation and in the first post-war years, the families of the murdered did not have the opportunity to commemorate their relatives while respecting Chinese traditions. For this reason, a Taoist ceremony was held in early 1948 in the neighbourhood of Siglap in the eastern part of Singapore, in what is known as the "Valley Of Tears" – where mass graves from the Japanese occupation period were suspected to be, a Taoist ceremony was held to "soothe hungry ghosts."

Thousands of Singaporean Chinese – mostly family members of the victims – took part in it. In the same year, a special committee was established, chaired by local businessman Tay Koh Yat. His task was to find the remains of Sook Ching victims. For the first dozen or so years, the effects of the committee's work were, however, extremely modest.

Discovery of mass graves
It was not until 1962 that the mass graves of Sook Ching victims were accidentally discovered at the "Valley Of Tears" in Siglap. On the initiative of the Singapore Chinese Chamber of Commerce and Industry, search and exhumation work began – also in other alleged Japanese crime scenes. In the years 1962 to 1966, nearly 100 graves were discovered. The Chinese community called for the construction of a cemetery in Siglap and a monument to the victims of the massacre. The remains of the victims of the Sook Ching would continue to be unearthed by locals for decades after the massacre.

Heritage sites
A memorial to the victims of the Japanese occupation, known as the Civilian War Memorial, was erected at Beach Road in central Singapore. It was unveiled on 15 February 1967, 25 years after the fall, during a ceremony attended by prime minister Lee Kuan Yew. The monument consists of four pillars, 67.4 meters high, symbolizing the four largest ethnic groups in the country. The pedestal of the memorial also has inscriptions written in Singapore's four official languages, English, Chinese, Malay, and Tamil. Under the monument, there is a tomb containing the remains of Sook Ching victims, which were found from 1962 to 1966. Every year on 15 February, on the anniversary of Singapore's surrender, ceremonies are held at the Civilian War Memorial in honor of the victims of the war.

The massacre sites of Changi Beach, Katong, Punggol Point, Tanah Merah and Sentosa were marked as heritage sites in 1992 to commemorate the 50th anniversary of the end of the Japanese occupation.

Among other sites, this specific war monument plaque was erected at the Changi Beach Park (near Camp Site 2) in the eastern part of Singapore. The inscription on the monument plaque, which was also repeated in Singapore's three other official languages of Chinese, Malay and Tamil, as well as in Japanese, reads:

Legacy
The massacre and its post-war judicial handling by the colonial British administration incensed the Chinese community. The Discovery Channel programme commented about its historic impact on local Chinese: "They felt the Japanese spilling of so much Chinese blood on Singapore soil has given them the moral claim to the island that hasn't existed before the war". Lee Kuan Yew said on the Discovery Channel programme, "It was the catastrophic consequences of the war that changed the mindset, that my generation decided that, 'No ... this doesn't make sense. We should be able to run this [island] as well as the British did, if not better.'" "The Asiatics had looked to them for leadership, and they had failed them."

Germaine Foo-Tan writes in an article carried on the Singapore Ministry of Defence (MINDEF) website:

The memories of those who lived through that period have been captured at exhibition galleries in the Old Ford Motor Factory at Bukit Timah, the site of the factory where the British surrendered to the Japanese on 15 February 1942.

Genocide classification
A published undergraduate thesis from the University of Oregon in 2020 argued that the circumstances surrounding Sook Ching should be defined as a genocide instead of a massacre. It is argued that since the crime was racially motivated, targeting primarily Chinese men of working age, the crime fits the classification of genocide as the pursuit of destroying and/or reducing that group's population.

See also
 Kenpeitai East District Branch
 Japanese war crimes
 Nanjing massacre
 Indonesian mass killings of 1965-66

Notes

References

Book sources

 Kang, Jew Koon (1981). "Chinese in Singapore during the Japanese occupation, 1942–1945." Academic exercise – Dept. of History, National University of Singapore.

External links

 A Short Walk – Animated short film of Sook Ching
 Sook Ching Inspection Centre

1942 in Singapore
1942 in Japan
Anti-Chinese sentiment in Asia
British rule in Singapore
Conflicts in 1942
February 1942 events
Genocides in Asia
Japanese occupation of Singapore
Japanese war crimes
History of Singapore
Mass murder in 1942
March 1942 events
Massacres committed by Japan
Massacres in Singapore
Massacres of men
Political and cultural purges
World War II massacres
Violence against men in Asia